Kırklareli is an electoral district of the Grand National Assembly of Turkey. It elects three members of parliament (deputies) to represent the province of the same name for a four-year term by the D'Hondt method, a party-list proportional representation system.

Members 
Population reviews of each electoral district are conducted before each general election, which can lead to certain districts being granted a smaller or greater number of parliamentary seats. Kırklareli's seat allocation has been three seats since 1999.

General elections

2011

June 2015

November 2015

2018

Presidential elections

2014

References 

Electoral districts of Turkey
Politics of Kırklareli Province